The western sheath-tailed bat (Paremballonura tiavato) is a species of sac-winged bat (family Emballonuridae) found in Madagascar.

Taxonomy
The western sheath-tailed bat was described as a new species in 2006. The holotype had been collected in January 2001 in Ankarana Reserve. It was placed in the genus Emballonura with a scientific name of Emballonura tiavato.
In 2012, a new genus of bat was described, Paremballonura. Both the western sheath-tailed bat and Peters's sheath-tailed bat were transferred to this new genus, making its scientific name Paremballonura tiavato. The species name "tiavato" is Malagasy for "likes rocks". The authors chose this name due to the likelihood of documenting this species in an area with exposed rocky outcrops.

Description
The fur on its back is long, somewhat silky in texture, and grayish brown, while the fur on its belly is paler.

Range and status
The western sheath-tailed bat is endemic to the island and country of Madagascar. So far, it has been documented on the western side of the island, which is karstic. As of 2017, it is evaluated as a least-concern species by the IUCN.

References

Endemic fauna of Madagascar
Bats of Africa
Mammals described in 2006